New Guardians for the Golden Gate: How America Got a Great National Park is a 2006 book by Amy Meyer which discusses the creation of the Golden Gate National Recreation Area in the early 1970s.

References

External links
 Fish and Wildlife Service interview with Meyer about the book.

2006 non-fiction books
Golden Gate National Recreation Area